Tolimán is the seat of Tolimán Municipality in the Mexican state of Querétaro. Its name comes from the Nahuatl word tolimani, meaning place where the tule tree is picked up.

See also
 Gudiños

Populated places in Querétaro